The Kiamichi Shale or Kiamichi Formation is a geologic formation in Arkansas and Texas. It preserves fossils dating back to the Cretaceous period.

See also

 List of fossiliferous stratigraphic units in Texas
 Paleontology in Texas

References

 

Cretaceous Arkansas
Geologic formations of Texas
Cretaceous System of North America